Eric Anderson (born December 14, 1972) is an American actor and singer. On Broadway, he has originated roles in Waitress, Kinky Boots, The Last Ship, Rocky, and Soul Doctor, and was nominated for a Drama Desk Award for Outstanding Actor in a Musical. He portrayed Mr. O’Malley in The Greatest Showman (2017).

California Theatre
In 2006, Anderson won the inaugural Joel Hirschhorn award for outstanding achievement in musical theatre, awarded by the Los Angeles Drama Critics Circle. He received two San Diego Critics Circle Craig Noel Awards  and multiple Back Stage West Garland Awards as best actor in a musical. His performances on the west coast stage have included Don Quixote in Man of La Mancha, Dr. Frank N. Furter in The Rocky Horror Show, Richard M. Nixon in Judy's Scary Little Christmas, and Burrs in both versions of The Wild Party. Anderson is a member of the Troubadour Theater Company. He left California in 2007 to play Merlyn in a U.S. national tour of Camelot opposite Michael York, and moved to New York in 2008. In 2020, he returned to the west coast to play Captain Hook in Fly  at La Jolla Playhouse.

Broadway
In 2009, Anderson made his Broadway debut as Stewpot in the Tony award-winning revival of South Pacific at Lincoln Center. He was in the original Broadway casts of Kinky Boots, written by Harvey Fierstein and Cyndi Lauper, Rocky the Musical, The Last Ship written by Sting, and Soul Doctor at the Circle in the Square Theatre, where he received critical acclaim for his starring role as Shlomo Carlebach. Anderson was nominated for a Drama Desk Award for Outstanding Actor in a Musical for his portrayal in the pre-Broadway production at New York Theatre Workshop. Anderson originated the role of Cal in the musical adaption of Waitress on Broadway, written by Sara Bareilles. Anderson also played the role of Barney Thompson in the musical adaptation of Pretty Woman. In 2022, he took over the role of Harold Zidler in Moulin Rouge! at the Al Hirschfeld Theatre; after Danny Burstein’s Departure to the show

Film and television
Anderson portrayed Mr. O’Malley in The Greatest Showman (2017), and has had guest roles on television, including Elementary, The Good Wife, Law & Order: Criminal Intent and Alias.

Personal life
Anderson is married to Broadway actress Jessica Rush, and has a daughter, Elliot.

Theatre credits

Awards and nominations

References

External links
 
 
 

1972 births
American male musical theatre actors
Back Stage West Garland Award recipients
Living people
Male actors from Newport Beach, California